The following is a list of artists who contributed to the British magazine Vanity Fair (1868–1914).

Artists

See also
Maîtres de l'Affiche
Vanity Fair (British magazine 1868–1914)
Vanity Fair caricatures

References

External links
 Bohun Lynch, A History of Caricature published by Faber and Gwyer, London, 1926

Vanity Fair